Tadlow is a small village and civil parish in South Cambridgeshire, England on the River Cam (or Rhee).

History
Tadlow's name is derived from the burial ground or 'Tumulus of a man named Tada', perhaps an Anglo-Saxon chieftain who established it. It was spelled Tadeslaue in 1080 and Tadelai in the 1086 Domesday Book.

There were 28 peasants present in 1086; the population peaked around 1300 but fell after 1400 to a level which it maintained until the 19th Century. Tadlow village declined after 1660. The medieval village probably developed around a street running south-south-east from the church. A hamlet called Pincote (now in Hatley parish, but probably decayed after 1450. New houses were built in the 1970s between two groups of 19th Century cottages.

Before the 19th Century, there was an ancient route westwards from Croydon, along the hill, with another 750 metres to the south along the river. The Cambridge to Biggleswade turnpike was built in 1826.

Governance
Tadlow is represented on South Cambridgeshire District Council by one councillor for The Mordens electoral ward and on Cambridgeshire County Council by one councillor for the Bassingbourn electoral division. It is in the parliamentary constituency of South Cambridgeshire, represented at the House of Commons by Anthony Browne.

Geography

The B1042 road bisects the parish, with Wrestlingworth to the west and Croydon to the east.

The main village street lies to the south of the road and the River Cam, or Rhee, forms the southern boundary. The parish borders Bedfordshire in the west and varies from 75 metres, along the northern boundary with Hatley, to less than 30 metres above sea level, along the river.

Demography
At the time of the 2001 census, Tadlow parish had 181 residents living in 78 households. All were White; 81.1% described themselves as Christian with the rest stating 'no religion' or not citing one.

Landmarks
A roll of honour in St Giles church commemorates the four Tadlow men killed in World War I and all those from the village who served in both World Wars.

Religious sites
The parish church, north of the Biggleswade to Cambridge road, is dedicated to St Giles and was founded around 1092. It is built in the Early English style with more modern Perpendicular additions and comprises a chancel, organ chamber, south porch, 13th Century nave, and a 14th Century western tower containing a clock and a peal of three bells. It was restored by William Butterfield in 1860 and is in the Diocese of Ely. It is a Grade II* listed building.

References

External links

 
Villages in Cambridgeshire
Civil parishes in Cambridgeshire
South Cambridgeshire District